Sultan is a position with several historical meanings. Originally, it was an Arabic abstract noun meaning "strength", "authority", "rulership", derived from the verbal noun  , meaning "authority" or "power". Later, it came to be used as the title of certain rulers who claimed almost full sovereignty (i.e., not having dependence on any higher ruler) without claiming the overall caliphate, or to refer to a powerful governor of a province within the caliphate. The adjectival form of the word is "sultanic", and the state and territories ruled by a sultan, as well as his office, are referred to as a sultanate.

The term is distinct from king, though both refer to a sovereign ruler. The use of "sultan" is restricted to Muslim countries, where the title carries religious significance, contrasting the more secular king, which is used in both Muslim and non-Muslim countries.

Brunei and Oman are the only independent countries which retain the title "sultan" for their monarchs. In recent years, the title has been gradually replaced by "king" by contemporary hereditary rulers who wish to emphasize their secular authority under the rule of law. A notable example is Morocco, whose monarch changed his title from sultan to king in 1957.

History of the term 
The word derives from the Arabic and Semitic root salaṭa "to be hard, strong". The noun sulṭān initially designated a kind of moral authority or spiritual power (as opposed to political power), and it is used in this sense several times in the Qur'an.

In the early Muslim world, ultimate power and authority was theoretically held by the caliph, who was considered the leader of the caliphate. The increasing political fragmentation of the Muslim world after the 8th century, however, challenged this consensus. Local governors with administrative authority held the title of amir (traditionally translated as "commander" or "prince") and were appointed by the caliph, but in the 9th century some of these became de facto independent rulers who founded their own dynasties, such as the Aghlabids and Tulunids. Towards the late 10th century, the term "sultan" begins to be used to denote an individual ruler with practically sovereign authority, although the early evolution of the term is complicated and difficult to establish. The first major figure to clearly grant himself this title was the Ghaznavid ruler Mahmud (r. 998–1030 CE) who controlled an empire over present-day Afghanistan and the surrounding region. Soon after, the Great Seljuks adopted this title after defeating the Ghaznavid Empire and taking control of an even larger territory which included Baghdad, the capital of the Abbasid caliphs. The early Seljuk leader Tughril Bey was the first leader to adopt the epithet "sultan" on his coinage. While the Seljuks acknowledged the caliphs in Baghdad formally as the universal leader of the Muslim community, their own political power clearly overshadowed the latter. This led to various Muslim scholars – notably Al-Juwayni and Al-Ghazali – attempting to develop theoretical justifications for the political authority of the Seljuk sultans within the framework of the formal supreme authority of the recognized caliphs. In general, the theories maintained that all legitimate authority derived from the caliph, but that it was delegated to sovereign rulers whom the caliph recognized. Al-Ghazali, for example, argued that while the caliph was the guarantor of Islamic law (shari'a), coercive power was required to enforce the law in practice and the leader who exercised that power directly was the sultan.

The position of sultan continued to grow in importance during the period of the Crusades, when leaders who held the title of "sultan" (such as Salah ad-Din and the Ayyubid dynasty) led the confrontation against the Crusader states in the Levant. Views about the office of the sultan further developed during the crisis that followed the destruction of Baghdad by the Mongols in 1258, which eliminated the remnants of Abbasid political power. Thenceforth, the surviving descendants of the Abbasid caliphs lived in Cairo under the protection of the Mamluks and were still nominally recognized by the latter. However, from this time on they effectively had no authority and were not universally recognized across the Sunni Muslim world. As protectors of the line of the Abbasid caliphs, the Mamluks recognized themselves as sultans and the Muslim scholar Khalil al-Zahiri argued that only they could hold that title. Nonetheless, in practice, many Muslim rulers of this period were now using the title as well. Mongol rulers (who had since converted to Islam) and other Turkish rulers were among those who did so.

The position of sultan and caliph began to blend together in the 16th century when the Ottoman Empire conquered the Mamluk Empire and became the indisputable leading Sunni Muslim power across most of the Middle East, North Africa, and Eastern Europe. The 16th-century Ottoman scholar and jurist, Ebüssuûd Mehmet Efendi, recognized the Ottoman sultan (Suleiman the Magnificent at the time) as the caliph and universal leader of all Muslims. This conflation of sultan and caliph became more clearly emphasized in the 19th century during the Ottoman Empire's territorial decline, when Ottoman authorities sought to cast the sultan as the leader of the entire Muslim community in the face of European (Christian) colonial expansion. As part of this narrative, it was claimed that when Sultan Selim I captured Cairo in 1517, the last descendant of the Abbasids in Cairo formally passed on the position of caliph to him. This combination thus elevated the sultan's religious or spiritual authority, in addition to his formal political authority.

During this later period, the title of sultan was still used outside the Ottoman Empire as well, as with the examples of the Somali aristocrats, Malay nobles and the sultans of Morocco (such as the Alaouite dynasty founded in the 17th century). It was, however, not used as a sovereign title by Shi'a Muslim rulers. The Safavid dynasty of Iran, who controlled the largest Shi'a Muslim state of this era, mainly used the Persian title Shah, a tradition which continued under subsequent dynasties. The term sultan, by contrast, was mainly given to provincial governors within their realm.

Feminine forms
As a feminine form of sultan, used by Westerners, is Sultana or Sultanah and this title has been used legally for some (not all) Muslim women monarchs and sultan's mothers and chief consorts. However, Turkish and Ottoman Turkish also uses sultan for imperial lady, as Turkish grammar uses the same words for both women and men. However, this styling misconstrues the roles of wives of sultans. In a similar usage, the wife of a German field marshal might be styled Frau Feldmarschall (similarly, in French, constructions of the type madame la maréchale were historically used for the wives of office-holders). The female leaders in Muslim history are correctly known as "sultanas". However, the wife of the sultan in the Sultanate of Sulu is styled as the "panguian" while the sultan's chief wife in many sultanates of Indonesia and Malaysia are known as "permaisuri", "Tunku Ampuan", "Raja Perempuan", or "Tengku Ampuan". The queen consort in Brunei especially is known as Raja Isteri with the title of Pengiran Anak suffixed, should the queen consort also be a royal princess.

Compound ruler titles

These are generally secondary titles, either lofty 'poetry' or with a message, e.g.:
Mani Sultan – Manney Sultan (meaning the "Pearl of Rulers" or "Honoured Monarch") – a subsidiary title, part of the full style of the Maharaja of Travancore
 Sultan of Sultans – the sultanic equivalent of the style King of Kings
 Certain secondary titles have a devout Islamic connotation; e.g., Sultan ul-Mujahidin as champion of jihad (to strive and to struggle in the name of Allah).
 Sultanic Highness – a rare, hybrid western-Islamic honorific style exclusively used by the son, daughter-in-law and daughters of Sultan Hussein Kamel of Egypt (a British protectorate since 1914), who bore it with their primary titles of Prince or Princess, after 11 October 1917. They enjoyed these titles for life, even after the Royal Rescript regulating the styles and titles of the Royal House following Egypt's independence in 1922, when the sons and daughters of the newly styled king (considered a promotion) were granted the title , or Royal Highness.
Sultan-ul-Qaum – a title meaning King of the Nation, given to 18th-century Sikh leader Jassa Singh Ahluwalia by his supporters

Former sultans and sultanates

Sultanates in Anatolia and Central Asia
 Ghaznavid Empire; its ruler, Mahmud of Ghazni, was the first Muslim sovereign to be known as sultan.
 Great Seljuk Empire
 Sultanate of Rum
 Ottoman Empire
 Timurid Empire

Caucasus
Elisu Sultanate and a few others. A Sultan ranked below a Khan.

Levant and Arabian peninsula

in Syria:
Ayyubid Sultans
Mamluk Sultans
in present-day Yemen, various small sultanates of the defunct Aden Protectorate and South Arabia:
Audhali, Fadhli, Haushabi, Kathiri, Lahej, Lower Aulaqi, Lower Yafa, Mahra, Qu'aiti, Subeihi, Upper Aulaqi, Upper Yafa and the Wahidi sultanates
in present-day Saudi Arabia:
Sultans of Nejd
Sultans of the Hejaz
Oman – Sultan of Oman (authentically referred to as Hami), on the southern coast of the Arabian peninsula, still an independent sultanate, since 1744 (assumed the formal title of Sultan in 1861)

North Africa

in Algeria: Sultanate of Tuggurt, Sultans of Tlemcen
in Egypt:
Ayyubid Sultans
Mamluk Sultans
Sultans of the Muhammad Ali dynasty
in Morocco, until Mohammed V changed the style to Malik (king) on August 14, 1957, maintaining the subsidiary style Amir al-Mu'minin (Commander of the Faithful)
in Sudan:
Darfur
Dar al-Masalit
Dar Qimr
Funj Sultanate of Sinnar (Sennar)
Kordofan
in Chad:
Baguirmi (main native title: Mbang)
Wada'i (main native title: Kolak), successor state to Birgu
Dar Sila (actually a wandering group of tribes)

Horn of Africa

Ajuran Sultanate, in southern Somalia and eastern Ethiopia
Adal Sultanate, in western Somaliland, southern Djibouti, and the Somali, Harari and Afar regions of Ethiopia
Isaaq Sultanate, in Somaliland and the Somali region of Ethiopia
Habr Yunis Sultanate, in Somaliland and Somali region of Ethiopia
Majeerteen Sultanate (Migiurtinia), in northern Somalia
Sultanate of the Geledi, in southern Somalia
Sultanate of Aussa, in northeastern Ethiopia
Sultanate of Harar, in eastern Ethiopia
Sultanate of Hobyo, in central Somalia
Sultanate of Ifat, in Somaliland, Djibouti and eastern Ethiopia
Sultanate of Mogadishu, in south-central Somalia
Sultanate of Showa, in central Ethiopia
Bimaal Sultanate, in south eastern Somalia centred in Merka

Southeast Africa and Indian Ocean
Angoche Sultanate, on the Mozambiquan coast (also several neighbouring sheikdoms)
various sultans on the Comoros; however on the Comoros, the normally used styles were alternative native titles, including Mfalme, Phany or Jambé and the 'hegemonic' title Sultani tibe
the Maore (or Mawuti) sultanate on Mayotte (separated from the Comoros)

Maliki
Apparently derived from the Arabic malik, this was the alternative native style of the sultans of the Kilwa Sultanate in Tanganyika (presently the continental part of Tanzania).

Swahili Coast

 Sultanate of Zanzibar: two incumbents (from the Omani dynasty) since the de facto separation from Oman in 1806, the last assumed the title Sultan in 1861 at the formal separation under British auspices; since 1964 union with Tanganyika (part of Tanzania)
Mfalume is the  title of various native Muslim rulers, generally rendered in Arabic and in western languages as Sultan:
in Kenya:
Pate on part of Pate island (capital also named Pate), in the Lamu Archipelago
Wituland, became a  German, then British protectorate
in Tanganyika (presently part of Tanzania): of Hadimu, on the island of that name; also styled Jembe

Sultani
This was the native ruler's title in the Tanzanian state of Uhehe.

West and Central Africa
In Cameroon:
Bamoun (Bamun, 17th century, founded uniting 17 chieftaincies) 1918 becomes a sultanate, but in 1923 re-divided into the 17 original chieftaincies.
Bibemi, founded in 1770 - initially styled lamido
Mandara Sultanate, since 1715 (replacing Wandala kingdom); 1902 Part of Cameroon
Rey Bouba Sultanate founded 1804
in the Central African Republic:
Bangassou created c.1878; 14 June 1890 under Congo Free State protectorate, 1894 under French protectorate; 1917 Sultanate suppressed by the French.
Dar al-Kuti - French protectorate since December 12, 1897
Rafai c. 1875 Sultanate, April 8, 1892, under Congo Free State protectorate, March 31, 1909, under French protectorate; 1939 Sultanate suppressed
Zemio c. 1872 established; December 11, 1894, under Congo Free State protectorate, April 12, 1909, under French protectorate; 1923 Sultanate suppressed
in Niger: Arabic alternative title of the following autochthonous rulers:
 the Amenokal of the Aïr confederation of Tuareg
 the Sarkin Damagaram since the 1731 founding of the Sultanate of Damagaram (Zinder)
in Nigeria most monarchies previously had native titles, but when most in the north converted to Islam, Muslim titles were adopted, such as emir and sometimes sultan.
 in Borno (alongside the native title Mai)
 since 1817 in Sokoto, the suzerain (also styled Amir al-Mu´minin and Sarkin Musulmi) of all Fulbe jihad states and premier traditional Muslim leader in the Sahel (according to some once a caliph)

Southern Asia
Afghan Kingdom: Sultan had a different meaning. It was a high title of honour, superior to Amir and Sardar, but ranking below Shah.
Bahmani Sultanate: Bahmani Shahs
Sultanate of Bengal: Ilyas Shahi, Ganesha, Habshi, Hussain Shahi, Muhammad Shah and Karranis
Sultanates of the Deccan:
Adil Shahi of Bijapur
Barid Shahi of Bidar
Imad Shahi of Berar
Nizam Shahi of Ahmednagar
Qutb Shahi of Golconda
Sultanate of Delhi: Mamluks, Khiljis, Tughlaqs, Sayyids and Lodis
Sultanate of Gujarat: Muzaffarids 
Sultanate of Jaunpur: Sharqi dynasty
Sultanate of Kandesh: Faruqi dynasty
Sultanate of Malwa: three dynasties
Sultanate of Madurai
Sultanate of Laccadive and Cannanore: Arakkal Kingdom
Sultanate of Kashmir: Shahmirids and Chaks
Sultanate of Maldives

Southeast and East Asia

In Indonesia (formerly in the Dutch East Indies):

On Kalimantan
Sultanate of Banjar 
Sultanate of Berau
Sultanate of Bulungan 
Sultanate of Gunung Tabur 
Sultanate of Kubu
Kutai Kartanegara Sultanate 
Sultanate of Mempawah 
Sultanate of Paser
Sultanate of Pontianak
Sultanate of Sambaliung
Sultanate of Sambas
On Sulawesi
Sultanate of Buton
Sultanate of Bone
Sultanate of Gowa
Sultanate of Luwu
Sultanate of Soppeng
Sultanate of Wajoq
On Java
Sultanate of Banten
Sultanate of Cirebon - the rulers in three of the four palaces (kraton), from which divided Cirebon was ruled: Kraton Kasepuhan, Kraton Kanoman and Kraton Kacirebonan (only in Kraton Kaprabonan was the ruler's title Panembahan)
Sultanate of Demak
Sultanate of Pajang
Sumedang Larang Sultanate
Sultanate of Mataram (was divided into two kingdoms: the Sultanate of Yogyakarta and Sunanan Surakarta)
 Sultanate of Yogyakarta (The Divine Sultanate of which its ruler Sri Sultan Hamengkubowono is considered a divine being, a half God) 
 Sunanate of Surakarta (susuhunan, a high-ranked monarch, equivalent to emperor)
In the Maluku Islands
Sultanate of Iha (Saparua)
Sultanate of Honimoa/ Siri Sori (Saparua)
 (West Seram)
 (Ambon)
 (Ambon)
Sultanate of Ternate
Sultanate of Tidore
Sultanate of Bacan
Sultanate of Jailolo
Sultanate of Loloda (North Halmahera)
In the Nusa Tenggara
Bima Sultanate on Sumbawa island
In the Riau Archipelago: sultanate of Lingga-Riau by secession in 1818 under the expelled sultan of Johore (on Malaya) Sultan Abdul Rahman Muadzam Syah ibni al-Marhum Sultan Mahmud
In Sumatra
Aceh Sultanate (full style Sultan Berdaulat Zillullah fil-Alam)
Sultanate of Asahan
 Awak Sungai, established 17th century at the split in four of Minangkabau, in 1816 extinguished by Netherlands East Indies colonial government
Sultanate of Deli 
Sultanate of Indragiri
Sultanate of Langkat (previous style Raja)
Palembang Sultanate (Darussalam), also holding the higher title of Susuhunan
Sultanate of Pagaruyung
Sultanate of Perleuak
Riau-Lingga Sultanate
Samudera Pasai Sultanate
Sultanate of Serdang
Sultanate of Siak

In Malaysia:
 In Peninsular Malaysia, where all seven of the country's present sultanates are located:
 Sultanate of Perlis
 Sultanate of Johor
 Sultanate of Kedah
 Sultanate of Kelantan
 Sultanate of Pahang
 Sultanate of Perak
 Sultanate of Selangor
 Sultanate of Terengganu
 Furthermore, the ruler of Luak Jelebu, one of the constitutive states of the Negeri Sembilan confederation, had the style Sultan in addition to his principal title Undang Luak Jelebu.
Sultanate of Malacca 
In Brunei:
 Sultan of Brunei, Brunei (on Borneo island)

In China:
 Dali, Yunnan, capital of the short-lived Panthay Rebellion
 Furthermore, the Qa´id Jami al-Muslimin (Leader of the Community of Muslims) of Pingnan Guo ("Pacified South State", a major Islamic rebellious polity in western Yunnan province) is usually referred to in foreign sources as Sultan.
 

In the Philippines:
 Sultanate of Buayan
 Sultanate of Maguindanao
 Sultanate of Sulu (Sulu, Basilan, Palawan and Tawi-Tawi islands and part of eastern Sabah on North Borneo)

In Thailand:
 Sultanate of Patani
 Sultanate of Singgora

Current sultans
Sultans of sovereign states
  Sultan Hassanal Bolkiah, Sultan and Yang di-pertuan of Nation of Brunei, the Abode of Peace
  Sultan Haitham bin Tariq, Sultan of the Sultanate of Oman

Sultans in Federal Monarchies
  Sultan Ibrahim Ismail, Sultan and Yang di-Pertuan of Malaysian State of Johor, The Abode of Dignity and its occupied territories
  Sultan Sallehuddin, Sultan and Yang-di Pertuan of Malaysian State of Kedah, the Abode of Safety
  Sultan Muhammad V, Al-Sultan and Yang di-Pertuan of Malaysian State of Kelantan, the Abode of Bliss and its dependencies
  Al-Sultan Abdullah Ri'ayatuddin, Sultan and Ruler of Malaysian State of Pahang, the Abode of Tranquility
  Sultan Nazrin Shah, Sultan, Yang di-Pertuan and the Ruler of Malaysian State of Perak, the Abode of Grace and its dependencies
  Sultan Sharafuddin Idris Shah, Sultan and Yang di-Pertuan of Malaysian State of Selangor, the Abode of Sincerity
  Sultan Mizan Zainal Abidin, Sultan and Yang di-Pertuan of Malaysian State of Terengganu, the Abode of Faith

Sultan with power within Republic
  Sri Sultan Hamengkubuwono X, Sultan and Governor of Indonesian Special Region of Yogyakarta

In some parts of the Middle East and North Africa, there still exist regional sultans or people who are descendants of sultans and who are styled as such. See List of current constituent Asian monarchs and List of current constituent African monarchs.

Princely and aristocratic titles

By the beginning of the 16th century, the title sultan was carried by both men and women of the Ottoman dynasty and was replacing other titles by which prominent members of the imperial family had been known (notably khatun for women and bey for men). This usage underlines the Ottoman conception of sovereign power as family prerogative.

Western tradition knows the Ottoman ruler as "sultan", but Ottomans themselves used "padişah" (emperor) or "hünkar" to refer to their ruler. The emperor's formal title consisted of "sultan" together with "khan" (for example, Sultan Suleiman Khan). In formal address, the sultan's children were also entitled "sultan", with imperial princes (Şehzade) carrying the title before their given name, with imperial princesses carrying it after. Example, Şehzade Sultan Mehmed and Mihrimah Sultan, son and daughter of Suleiman the Magnificent. Like imperial princesses, living mother and main consort of reigning sultan also carried the title after their given names, for example, Hafsa Sultan, Suleiman's mother and first valide sultan, and Hürrem Sultan, Suleiman's chief consort and first haseki sultan. The evolving usage of this title reflected power shifts among imperial women, especially between Sultanate of Women, as the position of main consort eroded over the course of 17th century, the main consort lost the title "sultan", which replaced by "kadin", a title related to the earlier "khatun". Henceforth, the mother of the reigning sultan was the only person of non imperial blood to carry the title "sultan".

In Kazakh Khanate a Sultan was a lord from the ruling dynasty (a direct descendants of Genghis Khan) elected by clans, i.e. a kind of princes. The best of sultans was elected as khan by people at Kurultai. See :ru:Казахские султаны

Military rank
In a number of post-caliphal states under Mongol or Turkic rule, there was a feudal type of military hierarchy. These administrations were often decimal (mainly in larger empires), using originally princely titles such as khan, malik, amir as mere rank denominations.

In the Persian empire, the rank of sultan was roughly equivalent to that of a modern-day captain in the West; socially in the fifth-rank class, styled 'Ali Jah.

See also

 Suratrana
 Mansa
 Khan (title), Ilkhan and Khakhan
 Emir (Amir)
 Atabeg
 Bey
 Baig
 Mirza
 Caliph
 Datu
 Maharajah
 Malik
 Mir (title)
 Padishah
 Pasha
 Raja
 Shah and Shahanshah
 Vizier
 Zoltán

References

Heads of state
Islamic honorifics
Military ranks
Royal titles
Noble titles
Positions of authority
 
Titles
Ottoman titles
Titles of national or ethnic leadership
Titles in Afghanistan
Titles in Bangladesh
Titles in Pakistan
Titles in Iran
Filipino paramount rulers
Filipino royalty